Mar Lawrence Mukkuzhy (born 31 August 1951) is the Syro-Malabar Catholic bishop of Diocese of Belthangady.

Early life 
Mar Lawrence Mukkuzhy was born on 31 August 1951 at Hosmota, [Kadaba] in Dakshina Kannada. He was  born as the 7th child to Thomas Mukkuzhy and Rosa Mukkuzhy. After his school at Aranthodu and Sullia, he joined St. Joseph's Minor Seminary, Thalassery. Mar Lawrence Mukkuzhy graduated from Nirmalagiri college, Kuthuparamba. Mar Lawrence Mukkuzhy completed his Philosophy and Theology studies from Pontifical Seminary in Aluva. On 27 December 1978 by Bishop Mar Sebastian Valloppilly, Lawrence Mukkuzhy was ordained as priest. He secured Master degree in English Literature from the University of Mysore.

See also 
Most Holy Redeemer Church, Belthangady
Belthangady
Church Higher Primary School, Belthangady
St. Theresa High School, Belthangady
Roman Catholic Diocese of Mangalore
Deanery of Belthangady
Diocese of Belthangady

References

External links 

1951 births
Christian humanists
Living people
People from Dakshina Kannada district
Christian clergy from Karnataka
University of Mysore alumni